Boneless may refer to:
 Meat sold without bones.  
 Boneless "buffalo wings," pieces of chicken made to resemble chicken wings.
 alt.binaries.boneless, a Usenet discussion forum
 "Boneless" (song), a song by Steve Aoki and Chris Lake with music producer Tujamo
 Ivar the Boneless (died 873), Viking leader
 Mogu, "boneless" wash painting, a type of painting by ink washes without outlines
 A fictional 2 dimensional race from Doctor Who